André Luís Brandão was the Angolan minister for transport from 1992 to 2008.

References

Angolan politicians
Living people
Year of birth missing (living people)
Place of birth missing (living people)